Varennes-en-Argonne (literally Varennes in Argonne) or simply Varennes (German: Wöringen) is a commune in the Meuse department in the Grand Est region in Northeastern France. In 2019, it had a population of 639.

Geography
Varennes-en-Argonne lies on the river Aire to the northeast of Sainte-Menehould, near Verdun.

History
It was the scene of the Flight to Varennes. In June 1791 Louis XVI, with his immediate family, made a dash for the nearest friendly border, that of the Austrian Netherlands in modern Belgium (Queen Marie-Antoinette being a sister to  Leopold II, Archduke of Austria and Holy Roman Emperor). But in Varennes Louis and his family were arrested, by Citizen Drouet, the local postmaster, who had been alerted by a message received from nearby Sainte-Menehould.  It is said that at Sainte-Menehould, where the escaping party had spent the previous night, a merchant alerted the town authorities of their presence after recognizing the King's face on an Assignat, as Louis tried to buy something from a shop. Once more the royal family returned to the Tuileries in humiliating captivity, and Louis and Marie-Antoinette were subsequently guillotined in 1793.

Located in the Zone rouge, Varennes was completely destroyed during the First World War but was reconstructed afterwards. The Pennsylvania Memorial, a monument for volunteers from 28th Division Pennsylvania in the First World War, was erected in Varennes during the Interwar period.

Points of interest
 Arboretum de Varennes-en-Argonne

See also
 Communes of the Meuse department

References

Varennesenargonne